Sylvia is a 1965 American drama film directed by Gordon Douglas, written by Sydney Boehm, and starring George Maharis, Carroll Baker, and Peter Lawford. The film is based on the novel of the same name by E. V. Cunningham in 1960.

Released by Paramount Pictures, it was filmed in Pittsburgh.

Plot
Sylvia West seems just about perfect in the eyes of middle aged California millionaire Frederic Summers, who proposes marriage to her. She is beautiful, brilliant, financially independent, writes poetry, and seems to personify exactly what he wants in a woman.

But as a precaution, Summers brings in a private investigator, the young Alan Macklin, to do a background check. Macklin travels to Sylvia's hometown of Pittsburgh, where to his surprise he learns that Sylvia has a history of selling sexual favors to middle-aged men. Librarian Irma tells Macklin that Sylvia always liked to read and helped her select literature from the library. She reads books in between clients to numb out her feelings. Raped by her stepfather, Jonas, she is an incest survivor who has a hard time setting boundaries. After her rape she turns to a fanatic priest who takes her to Mexico; he is later killed. She pays Oscar Stewart through sexual services to get her back to the United States on a road trip.

Back in the US,  Sylvia becomes friends with Jane, a sex worker, and helps her out after a life-threatening accident. To pay her medical bills, Sylvia sells sexual services through a transvestite madam. Sylvia is raped and assaulted by one of the clients, Bruce Stamford III, who buys her off to keep quiet about it. She invests the payoff, using advice from Jane's husband; these investments help Sylvia become financially independent and she publishes her poetry.

Macklin meets Sylvia and says he is interested in her poetry; the two of them fall in love. He confesses that he has been investigating her for her husband, and she is upset. He refuses to give his report to Summers, Sylvia eventually forgives Macklin, and they get together in the end.

Cast
 Carroll Baker as Sylvia West aka Sylvia Karoki
 Peter Lawford as Frederic Summers
 George Maharis as Alan Macklin
 Joanne Dru as Jane Phillips
 Viveca Lindfors as Irma Olanski
 Edmond O'Brien as Oscar Stewart
 Nancy Kovack as Big Shirley
 Ann Sothern as Grace Argona
 Jay Novello as Father Gonzales
 Aldo Ray as Jonas Karoki
Lloyd Bochner as Bruce Stamford III
Paul Gilbert as Lola Diamond
 Anthony Caruso as Muscles
Paul Wexler at Peter Memel
 Majel Barrett as Anne (Uncredited)

Production
The film was based on a novel by E. V. Cunningham, a pen name for Howard Fast. The novel was published by Doubleday in 1960, and was popular enough for Fast to write other suspense-mystery novels under the pseudonym of E. V. Cunningham, with titles that were women's names. (Others included Penelope.)

Film rights were bought by producer Martin Poll in April 1961. Poll called the film "a suspense love story". He originally set the film up at Paramount as a coproduction with Paul Newman and Martin Ritt's company – Newman was going to star and Ritt direct. Fast was hired to write a script and filming was scheduled to start December 1961. This did not happen. The project was reactivated in 1964 with Sydney Boehm writing the script and Robert Reed as a possible star. Carrol Baker, who had just made The Carpetbaggers and Mister Moses, was hired to play the lead. David Miller was signed to direct. The male lead role eventually went to George Maharis, who recently had left the cast of the hit CBS dramatic series Route 66 after recovering from a bout with hepatitis that he had contracted while performing stunt work in a body of water during filming of that series. During filming of Sylvia, Miller was replaced as director by Gordon Douglas.

Reception

Critical response
Bosley Crowther of the New York Times called it a "travesty of a film... it is hard to tell whether Carroll Baker... is worse than the script. Both are incredibly awful. Miss Baker is as lifeless as a stick, and the script... is a collection of all the clichés of bordello literature" and said that Gordon Douglas and Martin Poll "should both have their mouths washed out, their wrists slapped and their credentials as filmmakers taken away."

The staff at Variety wrote in their review: "Carroll Baker is joined in stellar spot by George Maharis as the private eye who ultimately falls in love with the woman he is tracing. Actually, although hers is the motivating character, top honours go to Maharis for a consistently restrained performance which builds, while actress suffers somewhat from the spotty nature of her haphazard part."

See also
List of American films of 1965

References

External links
 
Sylvia at TCM

1965 films
Films set in Pittsburgh
Films directed by Gordon Douglas
Films scored by David Raksin
1965 drama films
American drama films
1960s English-language films
Films based on American novels
1960s American films